is a passenger railway station located in the city of Ayabe, Kyoto Prefecture, Japan, operated by West Japan Railway Company (JR West).

Lines

Station layout
The station consists of one ground-level island platforms connected to the station building by a footbridge. The station is unattended.

Platforms

Adjacent stations

History
Yamaga Station opened on August 25, 1910. With the privatization of the Japan National Railways (JNR) on April 1, 1987, the station came under the aegis of the West Japan Railway Company.

Passenger statistics
In fiscal 2018, the station was used by an average of 46 passengers daily.

Surrounding area
 Shofuku-ji Garden (National Place of Scenic Beauty)
Yura River
 Japan National Route 27

See also
List of railway stations in Japan

External links

 Station Official Site

Railway stations in Kyoto Prefecture
Sanin Main Line
Railway stations in Japan opened in 1910
Ayabe, Kyoto